William Lewis Belew (May 20, 1931 – January 7, 2008) was an American costume designer who created stage outfits worn, among others, by Elvis Presley, Ella Fitzgerald, The Band, Gladys Knight, Gloria Estefan, Josephine Baker, Brooke Shields, Joan Rivers, Dionne Warwick, the Osmonds, and the Jacksons. It was Josephine Baker who encouraged Belew to work as a costume designer.

While he made costumes for plays, musicals, operas, ballets, TV specials and TV series, Belew is particularly famous for the stage outfits he made for Elvis. He created the tight-fitting black leather outfit that Elvis wore in the 1968 NBC Comeback Special, and the bell-bottomed jumpsuit outfits with high Napoleonic collars, pointed sleeve cuffs, wide belts and capes, decorated with gems, metal and rhinestone studding, sequins and embroidery. Belew also designed the suit Elvis is wearing on the famous photo of President Nixon and him in the Oval Office, a velveteen outfit originally designed for Elvis to use in his Las Vegas shows. Of the collars, Belew has explained that they were inspired by Napoleon's wardrobe and that he chose them because they would frame and draw attention to Presley's face.

In an interview Belew explained why most of the jumpsuits were white:
 During the 1970s Belew designed Elvis' offstage wardrobe, as well.

Among the most famous of Belew's Elvis jumpsuits are the American Eagle (created for the 1973 Elvis: Aloha from Hawaii via Satellite) and the Peacock (first worn at the Forum in Los Angeles in 1974, and later seen on the cover to the 1975 album Promised Land). In 2008 the Peacock suit was sold at an online auction for $300,000. This made it then the  most expensive piece of Elvis  clothing sold at auction. Another of his creations, the so called the “Aqua Blue Vine” broke that record selling for US$325,000 at a 2016 Graceland organized auction.  

The elaborate embroidery, which was getting a more prominent role on the jumpsuits in 1974–1977, was the work of Gene Doucette.

Belew died at the age of 76 from diabetes-related complications in Palm Springs, California.

References

External links
 

1931 births
2008 deaths
American fashion designers
People from Albemarle County, Virginia